CSI: Dark Motives is a computer game based on the CSI: Crime Scene Investigation television series. The game was developed by Radical Entertainment (under the 369 Interactive label), published by Ubisoft, and was released for the PC in 2004. In November 2007 it was remade by Powerhead Games, published by Ubisoft and released for Nintendo DS. The Microsoft Xbox version of CSI: Crime Scene Investigation also contains the cases featured in this game.

The Cases

Case 1: "Daredevil Disaster"
When Ace Dillinger, a professional stuntman for World's Wildest Stunts, crashes his motorbike at a stuntshow, there is a call for the CSI crew. You play a new recruit working with Catherine Willows on this case. The suspects are the stunt supervisor, the show's producer and a motorcycle mechanic.

Case 2: "Prints and Pauper"
A seemingly homeless man is found dead in an abandoned insane asylum. The contents of his stomach seem to show otherwise. You work with Warrick Brown on this case. The suspects in this case point to the owner of a classy French restaurant, a socialite whose father recently died and the manager of a Pawn Shop.

Case 3: "Diggin' It"
Human bones are dug up at a construction site for a new casino. It is believed the site is an ancient Indian burial ground. You work with Sara Sidle in this case. Suspects include the previous owner of the land, the construction supervisor, a university lecturer and a well-known psychic who had visions of when the victim was still alive.

Case 4: "Miss Direction"
A woman is shot dead during a rehearsal for a play, apparently shot with a prop gun. You will work with Nick Stokes in this mission. The suspects of this case are a fellow actress with whom the victim may have been having an affair with, the victim's husband and the stage manager.

Case 5: "Dragon and Dropping"
A poisonous Komodo is killed at a casino circus and a human toe is found in its cage. Who got this peaceful predator to attack the victim anyway? You work with Gil Grissom on this case. The suspects involved are the circus ringleader, a missing security guard, a funeral director, a local doctor and a retired Ukrainian air-force pilot.

Reception

Critical reviews

The PC version received "mixed" reviews according to the review aggregation website Metacritic.

Sales
In the United States, the PC version sold between 100,000 and 250,000 copies by August 2006, but was outsold by its predecessor, CSI: Crime Scene Investigation. It also received a "Silver" sales award from the Entertainment and Leisure Software Publishers Association (ELSPA), indicating sales of at least 100,000 copies in the United Kingdom. By August 2006, combined sales of computer versions of the CSI game franchise had reached 250,000 units in the United States alone. Global sales of the series totaled roughly 2.4 million copies across all platforms by that December, at the time of the fourth entry's announcement.

References

Notes

Citations

External links
 
 
 CSI: Dark Motives Game Help

2004 video games
Adventure games
Dark Motives
First-person adventure games
Nintendo DS games
Radical Entertainment games
Ubisoft games
Video games about police officers
Video games developed in Canada
Video games developed in the United States
Video games scored by Jake Kaufman
Video games set in the Las Vegas Valley
Windows games